The Palace of the Counts of Gómara (Spanish: Palacio de los Condes de Gómara) is a 16th-century palace located in Soria, Spain.

It is the most representative building of Renaissance civil architecture of the city of Soria.

Conservation 
The building is protected by the heritage listing Bien de Interés Cultural and has been protected since 1949.

References 

Bien de Interés Cultural landmarks in the Province of Soria
Palaces in Castile and León
Renaissance architecture in Castile and León